The 2013 South American Cross Country Championships took place on February 24, 2013.  The races were held at the Parque del Complejo Ayuí Resort y Spa Termal in Concordia, Entre Ríos, Argentina.  A detailed report of the event was given for the IAAF.

Complete results were published.

Medallists

Race results

Senior men's race (12 km)

Junior (U20) men's race (8 km)

Youth (U18) men's race (4 km)

Senior women's race (8 km)

Junior (U20) women's race (6 km)

Youth (U18) women's race (3 km)

Medal table (unofficial)

Note: Totals include both individual and team medals, with medals in the team competition counting as one medal.

Participation
According to an unofficial count, 91 athletes from 7 countries participated.  This is in agreement with the official numbers as published.

 (24)
 (1)
 (23)
 (1)
 (3)
 Perú (9)
 (30)

See also
 2013 in athletics (track and field)

References

South American Cross Country Championships
South American Cross Country Championships
South American Cross Country Championships
South American Cross Country Championships
2013 in South American sport
Cross country running in Argentina
February 2013 sports events in South America